The Roman Catholic Diocese of Solwezi is a diocese located in Solwezi in Zambia.

History
 April 9, 1959: Established as Apostolic Prefecture of Solwezi from the Apostolic Vicariate of Ndola
 December 9, 1976: Promoted as Diocese of Solwezi

Leadership
 Prefects Apostolic of Solwezi (Roman rite) 
 Fr. Rupert Hillerich, O.F.M. Conv. (1959 – 1969)
 Fr. Anselm Myers, O.F.M. Conv. (1969 – 1970.06.09)
 Fr. Severinah Abdon Potani, O.F.M. Conv. (Apostolic Administrator 1970.06.09 – 1976.12.09 see below)
 Bishops of Solwezi (Roman rite)
 Bishop Severinah Abdon Potani, O.F.M. Conv. (see above 1976.12.09 – 1993.12.26)
 Bishop Noel Charles O'Regan, S.M.A. (Apostolic Administrator 1994 – 1995.07.10); (1995.07.10 – 2004.10.01), appointed Bishop of Ndola; (Apostolic Administrator 2004.10.01 – 2007.05.30)
 Bishop Alick Banda (2007.05.30 - 2009.11.13), appointed Coadjutor Bishop of Ndola
 Bishop Charles Kasonde (since 2010.03.23)

See also
Roman Catholicism in Zambia

Sources
 GCatholic.org
 Catholic Hierarchy

Roman Catholic dioceses in Zambia
Christian organizations established in 1959
Roman Catholic dioceses and prelatures established in the 20th century
Roman Catholic Ecclesiastical Province of Lusaka